Jeongdo Hong (born November 11, 1977) is the Vice-chairman and CEO of JoongAng Group, the largest media group in South Korea with 23 subsidiary companies and 24 brands including newspapers, TV channels, magazines, a multiplex cinema chain, and leisure resorts. Hong is also the Vice-chairman and CDXO of JTBC, the fastest-growing general programming channel in South Korea since he founded it in December 2011. He is concurrently the Vice-chairman and CDXO of the JoongAng Ilbo, a major national newspaper in South Korea.

Early life
Hong studied history at Yonsei University in Seoul, South Korea, and received a bachelor's degree in Economics from Wesleyan University and his MBA from Stanford University, both in the United States.

CEO of a global media group
Since Hong joined the JoongAng group in 2005 as a member of the Strategic Planning Office, he has developed overall corporate strategies for the group. He played a crucial role in one of JMnet's most important projects, which also marked a key chapter in South Korea's recent media history. It was the regaining of broadcasting rights for TBC (Tongyang Broadcasting Company), South Korea's most popular channel in the 1960s and 70s, which was confiscated from the JoongAng media group by a military government in 1980. After years of work and preparation, the nationwide TV channel JTBC was finally launched in December 2011.

JTBC has been growing rapidly since its launch. The channel, which offers news, documentaries, dramas and a variety of entertainment programs, has been named in a viewer survey as the most balanced and informative channel for two consecutive years. It is setting new standards for dramas and entertainment programs. Popular JTBC programs such as Non-Summit and Please Take Care of My Refrigerator are broadcast around the world through the sale of broadcast rights to overseas networks.

Hong has also led a sub-branding strategy to strengthen JTBC's brand, creating synergies as a result. In addition to JTBC, the flagship general programming channel, there is also JTBC2, the entertainment channel formerly known as QTV, and JTBC3 Fox Sports, a partnership with Fox International Channels Asia. J Golf was relaunched as JTBC Golf in 2015.

Another highlight of Hong's work was in 2009, when he led the JoongAng Ilbo's ambitious project to switch the paper's printing format to Berliner, the first such innovative change in all of Asia. In 2011, Hong headed the successful merger and acquisition of two major movie theater franchises, Megabox and Cinus. The acquisitions strengthened JMnet's position in the entertainment industry.

Global activities
Hong is a member of the WAN-IFRA (World Association of Newspapers and News Publishers) Asia Pacific Committee. He was named a World Economic Forum Young Global Leader in 2010. He also joined WEF's Global Agenda Council.

References

1977 births
Living people
South Korean chief executives
Stanford University alumni
Wesleyan University alumni
Yonsei University alumni